Charles A. Alluaud (4 May 1861, Limoges – 12 December 1949, Crozant) was a French entomologist.

Biography
The Alluaud family had owned porcelain factories since the 18th century. Jean-Baptiste-Camille Corot (1796–1875) taught painting to Charles and his brother Eugene.

Charles left Limoges for Paris to supplement his studies but was an undisciplined pupil. The death of his parents enabled him to become an explorer. From 1887 to 1930, he went on many journeys in Africa (Ivory Coast, Madagascar, Kilimanjaro, Tunisia, Morocco, Sudan, the Sahara, Niger), the Canary Islands, Seychelles and Mascarene Islands. He was the author of 165 entomological publications.

Legacy
Emmanuel Drake del Castillo (1855–1904) dedicated the plant genus Alluaudia to him.

A genus and three species of reptiles are named in his honor: Alluaudina, Amphiglossos alluaudi, Langaha alluaudi, and Uroplatus alluaudi. A species of ant, Plagiolepis alluaudi, is also named after him.

Selected works
Voyage de Ch. Alluaud et R. Jeannel en Afrique Orientale (1911–1912). Résultats scientifiques, 1-6. (1913–1919).

References

Sources
Jean Lhoste (1987). French Entomologists. 1750–1950. INRA Editions: 351 p.
Translation from French Wikipedia

French entomologists
Presidents of the Société entomologique de France
1861 births
People from Limoges
1949 deaths